The Imprensa Nacional-Casa da Moeda (National Printing House, and Mint, abbreviated INCM), is the Portuguese mint and national press, owned by the Portuguese Government and administratively subordinated to the Portuguese Ministry of Finance. It is located in Lisbon in the São Mamede (Santo António) neighborhood.

History
The Casa da Moeda was established at least in the late 13th century. It produced legal tender coins and banknotes. It also produced medals and security prints (i.e., passports, subway tokens, postage stamps) that are used and issued by government-run service providers. In 1972 it was merged with the Imprensa Nacional (National Press) into Imprensa Nacional Casa da Moeda through the Law Decree nr. 225/72 of July 4.
Imprensa Nacional-Casa da Moeda (INCM) has the mission of publishing the Official Journal (Diário da República), through which all citizens become aware of the acts that govern the life of Portuguese society. As provided for in art. 119 of the Portuguese Constitution, if the regulatory acts are not published, they have no legal effect.

See also

 Portuguese Escudo

References

External links
  

13th-century establishments in Portugal
Mints (currency)
Mints of Europe
Banknote printing companies
Government-owned companies of Portugal
Companies based in Lisbon